SFAI may refer to:
 San Francisco Art Institute
 Società per le strade ferrate dell'Alta Italia, Upper Italian Railways
 Santa Fe Associates International (SFAI), a professional services network